Arabian Ranches is an upscale gated villa community in Dubai, United Arab Emirates launched in 2004. Located in Wadi Al Safa 6, along Sheikh Mohammad Bin Zayed Road and in proximity to Dubai's Global Village. It includes the Arabian Ranches Golf Club, Dubai Equestrian & Polo Club.

Arabian Ranches 2 was introduced in 2012. Located 9 km inland, off the Al Qudra Road and consists of eleven village-style communities. Arabian Ranches 3 launched in 2019 is the third community consisting of Townhouses that is under construction and expected to be completed by 2021 end.

Development 

Arabian Ranches 1, a desert-themed development occupies 1,650 acres including a golf course and other types of communities.

Architects working on the project include Bassenian Lagoni, Melzer Decker & Ruder Architects, and LCRA Architects.

Arabian Ranches 3 Provident Estate is the last phase of Arabian Ranches and is to include three and four-bedroom townhouses. Located next to the Global village is a central park spanning an area of over 30,000 square meters, or about 7.5 acres.

It will also feature a four kilometer boulevard, some community parks with play areas for children, as well as wellness and sports facilities.

The green neighborhood will also feature a river, some cycling tracks, a retail strip, a clubhouse, a community center, a mosque, schools and healthcare facilities.

Residential 

The residential core of Arabian Ranches 1 is composed of over 4,000 villas & townhouses, while Arabian Ranches 2 is composed of over 1,724 themed villas and townhouses. The third development, Arabian Ranches 3, is currently under construction.

The residential aspect of the development is supported by a variety of retail, leisure, and entertainment developments.

Retail

Arabian Ranches Shopping Centre 
Arabian Ranches Shopping Centre is a regional shopping center located in Arabian Ranches 1. It houses 20 retail outlets, a mosque, and a healthcare center.

The Ranches Souk 
The Ranches Souk is a regional shopping center located in Arabian Ranches 2. It houses over 35 retail units spread over two floors. Businesses currently operating in the shopping center include Carrefour, Virgin Megastore, Claires, Mothercare, Skechers, Early Learning Centre, Holland & Barrett, Al Jaber, Bin Sina Pharmacy, The Body Shop, Pet's Delight and Sun & Sand etc. Food and beverage retailers include Coldstone Creamery, Caribou Coffee, Carluccio's, Chez Sushi, Leila, McDonald's, Paul and Bateel Café. Arcade and amusement games are situated at Magic Planet.

Leisure

Arabian Ranches Golf Club 
Opened in February 2004, the 18-hole, 72 par course was designed by Ian Baker-Finch in association with Nicklaus Design. In 2014, a 2-year enhancement project was completed.

Equestrian Centre 
The  Arabian Ranches development is home to an Andalusian-style Equestrian Centre specializing in services and events that include polo, show jumping and horseback trail riding in the desert.

Infrastructure

Education 
The Arabian Ranches 1&2 development is home to Jumeirah English Speaking School and Ranches Primary School. These offer primary and secondary education, orientated towards the National British Curriculum. It also offers a post-secondary International Baccalaureate Diploma course.

References 

Communities in Dubai
Gated communities